Cốm or simply called green rice is a flattened and chewy green rice in Vietnamese cuisine. It is not dyed green but is immature rice kernels roasted over very low heat then pounded in a mortar and pestle until flattened. Cốm is a seasonal dish associated with autumn. It can be eaten plain or with coconut shavings. The taste is slightly sweet with a nutty flavor. It is a popular seasonal dessert across Vietnam, especially in Red River Delta cuisine. It is traditionally produced at the Cốm Vòng village in Hanoi.

A traditional pastry, bánh cốm (green rice cake), is made using cốm with mung bean filling. Cốm is often offered to worship the ancestors in the Mid-Autumn Festival. The green rice can also be used in a sweet soup, chè cốm. Cốm can be flatten further for a dish called cốm dẹp among the Khmer people.

See also
Flattened rice
Pinipig, a similar dish from the Philippines which uses green glutinous rice grains
Poha (rice), a similar dish in South Asia which uses mature rice grains
Rolled oats

References

External links
Com Me Tri Vietnam Official Website

Vietnamese rice dishes